Tokovye is a rural locality (a village) in Yugskoye Rural Settlement, Cherepovetsky District, Vologda Oblast, Russia. The population was 1 as of 2002.

Geography 
Tokovye is located 73 km southeast of Cherepovets (the district's administrative centre) by road. Spas-Lom is the nearest rural locality.

References 

Rural localities in Cherepovetsky District